The K-SAAM (Korean Surface to Air Anti Missile,  "Haegung", Hanja: 海弓) is a South Korean medium range ship-based surface-to-air missile (SAM) system that is being developed by the Agency for Defense Development (ADD), LIG Nex1 and Hanhwa Defense. It features inertial mid-course guidance and a dual microwave and Infrared homing seeker for terminal guidance. It will replace RIM-116 Rolling Airframe Missile (RAM). It deployed on Daegu-class frigates and ROKS Marado.

History
Development started in 2011 which was extended for 2 more years after series of failures during testing in 2016 with testing in 2017 being deemed successful and questioned by anonymous source with knowledge involving evaluation test which referred to North Korean Kumsong-3 anti-ship missile as one of major threats for ROK navy's ships along with other neighbouring countries.

See also
 ESSM
 VL MICA
 Sea Ceptor
 KM-SAM

References

21st-century surface-to-air missiles
Post–Cold War weapons of South Korea
Surface-to-air missiles of South Korea